Alphavirus infection may be caused by a Sindbis virus infection, and result in a cutaneous eruption of multiple, erythematous, 4- to 4-mm papules.

See also 
 Alphavirus
 Skin lesion

References 

Virus-related cutaneous conditions